

This is a list of the National Register of Historic Places (NRHP) designated in Worcester County, Massachusetts. The locations of NRHP properties and districts for which the latitude and longitude coordinates are included below, may be seen in a map.

Cities and towns listed separately
The following Worcester County cities and towns have large numbers of sites listed in the National Register of Historic Places.  Lists of their sites are on separate pages, linked below.

Other cities and towns in central and southern Worcester County

|}

Former listing

|}

References

Buildings and structures in Worcester County, Massachusetts
Worcester